Miodrag Todorović (born 10 September 1995) is a Serbian football forward who plays for Car Konstantin.

Career

Car Konstantin
Born in Niš, Todorović started his career with local club Car Konstantin. Beginning of 2012, Todorović signed two-year deal, and became the youngest player with scholarship contract in club history. Later, in 2014, Todorović contract with Radnički Niš, but stayed with Car as a loaned player. For the first 3 seasons, he scored 20 goals on 70 matches in Serbian League East. Miodrag also appeared in final cup matches in the district of Niš for 2013 and 2014. Although he had started 2014–15 season with first team of Radnički Niš, Todorović returned in Car Konstantin on dual registration until the end of season. He also continued playing with club on dual registration for the 2015–16 season.

Radnički Niš
Todorović signed five-year professional contract with Radnički Niš beginning of 2014, but he joined the first team 6 months later, for the 2014–15 season, and he was licensed with jersey number 44, later was given to Bauyrzhan Turysbek, after Todorović left on loan. Todorović made his official debut for Radnički Niš in the Serbian SuperLiga match against Red Star Belgrade, played on 10 August 2014, under coach Dragoslav Stepanović. Later, the same month, he made 1 more appearance, against Jagodina, but later he was to Car Konstantin, where he stayed until 2015. He scored his first SuperLiga goal for Radnički Niš in a match against Javor Ivanjica, played on 21 February 2016. Todorović left the club in summer 2016.

Career statistics

Honours
Car Konstantin
Niš district cup (2): 2013, 2014

Notes

References

External links
 Miodrag Todorović stats at utakmica.rs
 Miodrag Todorović stats at footballdatabase.eu

1995 births
Living people
Sportspeople from Niš
Association football forwards
Serbian footballers
FK Radnički Niš players
Serbian SuperLiga players